The term Diocese of Western Europe or Eparchy of Western Europe may refer to:

 Serbian Orthodox Diocese of Western Europe, a diocese (eparchy) of the Serbian Orthodox Church
 Antiochian Orthodox Diocese of France and Western Europe, a diocese (eparchy) of the Greek Orthodox Patriarchate of Antioch
 Bulgarian Orthodox Diocese of Western and Central Europe, a diocese (eparchy) of the Bulgarian Orthodox Church
Georgian Orthodox Diocese of Western Europe, a diocese (eparchy) of the Georgian Orthodox Church
 Russian Orthodox Diocese of Geneva and Western Europe, a former diocese (eparchy) of the Russian Orthodox Church Outside of Russia, now merged into the Russian Orthodox Diocese of Great Britain and Western Europe
Patriarchal Exarchate in Western Europe, an exarchate of the Russian Orthodox Church

See also
 Western Europe
 Diocese of Central Europe (disambiguation)